Login Halt railway station served the hamlet of Login, Carmarthenshire, Wales, from 1875 to 1962 on the Whitland and Cardigan Railway.

History 
The station was opened on 12 July 1875 by the Whitland and Taf Vale Railway. It was situated south of a junction between two minor roads. The original station only had a wooden shed as a station building. A new station was built in 1886. This had a large station building which incorporated the stationmaster's House, a booking office and a waiting room. This was at the north end of the platform. To the north end was a ground frame in a wooden cabin which controlled a goods siding. The station was downgraded to a halt in September 1956, thus the suffix 'halt' was added to its name. Staff still worked at the station to operate the ground frame. The station closed on 10 September 1962. It has been restored since; the station building's windows have been rebuilt with timber, the platform has been restored and the ground frame, as well as its signs, have been found after being buried in 50 years worth of undergrowth.

References

External links 
http://www.loginrailwaystation.co.uk/index.php 

Disused railway stations in Pembrokeshire
Railway stations in Great Britain opened in 1875
Railway stations in Great Britain closed in 1962
1875 establishments in Wales
1962 disestablishments in Wales